Juha Petri Mäenpää (born 25 October 1971) is a Finnish politician currently serving in the Parliament of Finland for the Finns Party at the Vaasa constituency.

References

1971 births
Living people
Members of the Parliament of Finland (2019–23)
Finns Party politicians
21st-century Finnish politicians